Nicol Gastaldi (born 16 February 1990 in Piove di Sacco, Italy) is an alpine skier from Argentina.  She competed for Argentina at the 2010 Winter Olympics.  Her best result was a 48th place in the giant slalom. Gastaldi also competed for Argentina at the 2018 Winter Olympics.

Her brother is also a skier, Sebastiano Gastaldi.

References

External links
 
 
 
 

1990 births
Living people
Argentine female alpine skiers
Olympic alpine skiers of Argentina
Alpine skiers at the 2010 Winter Olympics
Alpine skiers at the 2018 Winter Olympics
Sportspeople from the Province of Padua
Italian emigrants to Argentina